Royal Naval Air Station Crail or RNAS Crail (HMS Jackdaw) is a former Royal Naval Air Station of the Fleet Air Arm located  east of Anstruther, Fife and  from St Andrews, Fife, Scotland.  It was home to a site of the Joint Services School for Linguists from 1956 to 1960.

Units
A number of units were here at some point:

Current use
The site is currently used for industrial work farming and car drag racing.

See also
 List of air stations of the Royal Navy

References

Citations

Bibliography

Royal Naval Air Stations in Scotland